Ylber Sefa (born 15 February 1991) is an Albanian cyclist, who currently rides for UCI Continental team .

Major results

2010
 1st Stage 1 Tour of Albania
 2nd Road race, National Road Championships
2011
 1st  Overall Tour of Kosovo
1st Stage 1
 2nd Time trial, National Road Championships
 3rd Overall Tour of Albania
1st Prologue & Stage 3
2012
 National Road Championships
2nd Road race
2nd Time trial
 3rd Overall Tour of Albania
2015
 2nd Overall Tour of Kosovo
1st Stage 4
 3rd Overall Tour of Albania
1st Stage 1
2016
 1st  Overall Tour of Albania
1st Prologue & Stages 1, 2, 4 & 5
 1st  Overall Tour of Kosovo
1st Stage 1
 2nd Time trial, National Road Championships
 5th Balkan Elite Road Classics
2017
 1st  Road race, National Road Championships
 1st Omloop van de Grensstreek
2018
 1st  Road race, National Road Championships
 9th Overall Tour of Iran (Azerbaijan)
2019
 1st  Road race, Balkan Road Championships
 National Road Championships
1st  Road race
1st  Time trial
 2nd GP Briek Schotte
 10th Overall Tour of Albania
1st Stage 1
2020
 National Road Championships
1st  Road race
1st  Time trial
2021
 National Road Championships
1st  Road race
1st  Time trial
2022
 1st  Overall Tour of Albania
1st Stages 1 & 5
 National Road Championships
1st  Road race
1st  Time trial

References

External links

1991 births
Living people
Albanian male cyclists
European Games competitors for Albania
Cyclists at the 2019 European Games
Competitors at the 2018 Mediterranean Games
Mediterranean Games competitors for Albania
Sportspeople from Tirana